Kaye William "Bill" Stinson (April 20, 1930 – January 9, 2002) was a U.S. Representative from Washington.

Early life and education
Born in Grand Rapids, Michigan, Stinson attended the public schools and Grand Rapids Junior College for two years. He graduated in 1952 from the University of Michigan at Ann Arbor.

Career
He entered the executive training program of Westinghouse Electric Company. He enlisted in the United States Navy in January 1953, attended Officers' Candidate School and served until June 1956.  He was employed with Westinghouse Electric Corp. in Seattle, Washington from 1956 to 1959. He was also a manufacturer's representative in the marine and sporting goods industry from 1959 to 1962.

Stinson was elected as a Republican to the Eighty-eighth Congress (January 3, 1963 – January 3, 1965). He was an unsuccessful candidate for reelection in 1964 to the Eighty-ninth Congress.

Later life and death
He was a resident of Battle Ground, Washington before his death on January 9, 2002. Stinson died while vacationing in Cabo San Lucas, Mexico with his wife and daughter.

References

1930 births
2002 deaths
Politicians from Grand Rapids, Michigan
University of Michigan alumni
United States Navy officers
Republican Party members of the United States House of Representatives from Washington (state)
20th-century American politicians
Grand Rapids Community College alumni
Military personnel from Michigan